IJN may refer to:

 International Justice Network, a human rights organization
 Imperial Japanese Navy, the navy of Japan from 1868 until it was dissolved in 1945
 Institut Jean Nicod, a French interdisciplinary research center
 Institut Jantung Negara, National Heart Institute of Malaysia
 Intermountain Jewish News, an international weekly newspaper publication located in Denver, Colorado